Channel 854, previously known as Channel 425, though actually William Hill TV but could not be referred to this name due to broadcasting rules, was a satellite television sports and gambling channel in both Ireland and the United Kingdom broadcasting as a free-to-air service on Sky Digital. Owned by William Hill and YooMedia, the channel launched on 6 October 2004 and replaced the previous occupant iSports TV, which shared several programming features.

Its main focus was on betting and gaming, showing mostly live greyhound racing, electronic and presenter-hosted interactive game shows, and poker. The channel briefly also showed live Brazilian football, live Major League Baseball, live horse racing, and live daytime studio phone-in programming from talkSPORT radio station, known as talkSPORT TV.

After much of the sports based programming left the station, the channel was moved from the sports section to the gaming section of the EPG, and changed to being named as Channel 854 as a result. The poker element however retained the Poker 425 name. The remaining poker and live greyhound racing later ceased on 28 October 2006. The channel then only broadcast a promo for Monte Carlo Roulette 24-hours per day. The channel was removed from the EPG on 3 January 2007.

External links
Channel 854

Television channels in the United Kingdom